Carta marina et descriptio septemtrionalium terrarum (Latin for Marine map and description of the Northern lands; commonly abbreviated Carta marina) is the first map of the Nordic countries to give details and place names, created by Swedish ecclesiastic Olaus Magnus and initially published in 1539. Only two earlier maps of the Nordic countries are known, those of Jacob Ziegler (Strasbourg, 1532) and Claudius Clavus (15th century).

The map is centered on Scandia, which is shown in the largest size text on the map and placed on the middle of Sweden. The map covers the Nordic lands of "Svecia" (Svealand) and "Gothia" (Götaland) (both areas in Sweden), "Norvegia" (Norway), Dania (Denmark), Islandia (Iceland), Finlandia (Finland), Lituania (Lithuania) and Livonia (Estonia and Latvia). The map is framed with longitudes and latitudes running from 55° to the Arctic Circle.

The 1.70 m wide by 1.25 m tall map was printed in black and white from nine 55x40 cm woodcut blocks sequenced from west to east and north to south and identified in the center with the letters A through I.

History
The map was created in Rome during 1527–39 by Olaus Magnus (1490–1557), who arrived on a diplomatic visit for the Swedish government and stayed on, likely because his brother Johannes Magnus became involved in a religious feud with King Gustav I of Sweden.

To construct the map, Magnus drew from a variety of ancient sources including Ptolemy's map in Geographia, and contemporary sources such as the work of Astronomer Jacob Ziegler. In addition to cartographic sources, Magnus also relied on the descriptions of sailors and his own observations.

The map was in production for 12 years; the first copies were printed in 1539 in Venice.

Olaus complemented the map with Historia de gentibus septentrionalibus ("A description of the Northern peoples") printed in Rome, 1555. These Latin notes were translated by Olaus into Italian (1565) and German (1567).

Surviving copies
All of the original map's copies passed out of public knowledge after 1574, and the map was largely forgotten – perhaps because few copies were printed and Pope Paul III asserted a 10-year "copyright." It was later widely questioned whether the map had ever existed.

In 1886, Oscar Brenner found a copy at the Hof- und Staatsbibliothek in Munich, where it currently resides. In 1961, another copy was found in Switzerland, brought to Sweden the following year by the Uppsala University Library; as of 2007 it is stored there at the Carolina Rediviva library. The copies differ slightly from each other.

Adaptations
A downscaled adaptation of the 'Uppsala' copy or similar was printed in Rome by Antoine Lafréry in 1572.

See also
Martin Waldseemüller, who had created an earlier similar map of the world in 1516 with the same title
Sea Swine, a mythical creature featured in the Carta marina

Notes

References
 "Geografiens och de geografiska upptäckternas historia / Geography and The Geographical Voyager's history" (1899)
 "Carta marina et descriptio : the commentary by Olaus Magnus to Map of the Scandinavian countries 1539", Provisional ed. (1988)

External links

Digital copies of the first known 'München' original

Digital copies of the second known 'Uppsala' original
 
"University of Minnesota Carta Marina" - Unknown colored reproduction of the Uppsala original, in jpeg images. The site contains more information on early printing process.

Digital copies of modifications and adaptations
 
Carta Marina, Lafreris edition 1572 at the World Digital Library (Antoine Lafréry's (1512 - 1577) edition from 1572 digitized by the National Library of Sweden in Stockholm. Colored afterwards.

Historic maps of Europe
Scandinavian history
1539 works
16th-century maps and globes
Maps of Scandinavia